The United States Community Health Services and Facilities Act was enacted by the 87th United States Congress and signed into law on October 5, 1961. Its passage was encouraged by the 1961 White House Conference on Aging, which is held once every ten years.  

The 1961 act funded grants to the states for the expansion of medical services facilities like nursing homes, and medical programs for general public health and outpatient services for the elderly.  It also extended and strengthened the 1946 Hill–Burton Act.

See also
 Community Mental Health Act
 United States Department of Health and Human Services

References  

1965 in law
87th United States Congress
United States federal health legislation